Aristeus is a genus of Dendrobranchiata decapod crustaceans. Some species are subject to commercial fisheries.

Taxonomy
The genus was described in 1840. The following species are classified in this genus:

References

Dendrobranchiata
Decapod genera